Iru is a subdistrict in the district of Pirita, Tallinn, the capital of Estonia. It has a population of 35.

See also
Iru village (Jõelähtme Parish)
Pirita River
Iru Power Plant

References 

Subdistricts of Tallinn